The 1975 Mississippi gubernatorial election took place on November 4, 1975, in order to elect the Governor of Mississippi. Incumbent Democrat Bill Waller was term-limited, and could not run for reelection to a second term. , this was the last time Washington County voted for the Republican candidate.

Democratic primary
No candidate received a majority in the Democratic primary, which featured 6 contenders, so a runoff was held between the top two candidates. The runoff election was won by former state representative Cliff Finch, who defeated Lieutenant Governor William Winter.

Results

Runoff

General election

Campaign
During the campaign, Finch forged a coalition of African American and working class white voters in a populist-style gubernatorial campaign, adopted the campaign slogan "The working man's friend". This campaign tactic proved popular as Finch was elected over Republican nominee Gil Carmichael and the African American independent candidate Henry Kirksey. Carmichael did, however, draw 45 percent of the vote, an exceptionally high figure for a statewide Republican candidate at that time.

Results

Analysis 
Historian David Sansing described Mississippi's 1975 gubernatorial election as "one of the most unusual in the state's history".

References

Works cited 
 

1975
gubernatorial
Mississippi